Naso tergus is a species of reef surgeonfish in the family Acanthuridae. It was first discovered in 2011 off of the coast of Taiwan after several specimens were collected.

References
 

Naso (fish)
Fish of Taiwan
Fish of the Pacific Ocean
Fish described in 2011